Westworld is a science fiction media franchise created by Michael Crichton.

Westworld may also refer to:

Film and television
Westworld (film), a 1973 film by Michael Crichton, which inspired the franchise
Westworld (TV series), 2016 HBO television series based on the 1973 film
Westworld (soundtrack), soundtrack to the television series

Music
Westworld (American band), a side project of Tony Harnell and others
Westworld (British band), a British rock band active in the late 1980s
Westworld (Theatre of Hate album), 1982

Other uses
WestWorld, a sports complex in Scottsdale, Arizona, United States

See also
Westword
Western World (disambiguation)